Spirits of Fire is the self-titled first album by international supergroup Spirits of Fire. It was released on February 22, 2019, on the Neapolitan label Frontiers Records and produced by LA-based guitar player Roy Z. It was preceded by three singles, "Light Speed Marching" on November 15, 2018, "Stand and Fight" on January 15, 2019, and "It's Everywhere" on February 15, 2019.

The keyboards are played by Italian multi-instrumentalist Alessandro Del Vecchio.

Track listing

Personnel

Tim "Ripper" Owens - lead and backing vocals
Chris Caffery - guitars, recording, backing vocals
Steve DiGiorgio - bass, recording
Mark Zonder - drums

Additional personnel
Alessandro Del Vecchio - keyboards, recording
Roy Z - additional guitars, producing, recording, mixing
Maor Appelbaum - mastering

References

2019 debut albums
Frontiers Records albums
Albums produced by Roy Z